The George Hotel is a 3 star hotel located in the English town of Swaffham, within the county of Norfolk, United Kingdom. The hotel is a grade II listed building.

Location

Description 
The George Hotel was originally built in the early years of the 18th century with the main façade seen today built in 1860. The hotel was extended in 1979 with further developments added between 1988 and 1989.

References 

Grade II listed buildings in Norfolk
Swaffham
Hotels in Norfolk